In the mathematical discipline of measure theory, the intensity of a measure is the average value the measure assigns to an interval of length one.

Definition 
Let  be a measure on the real numbers.

Example 
Look at the Lebesgue measure . Then for a fixed , it is

so

Therefore the Lebesgue measure has intensity one.

Properties 
The mapping 

defined by

is measurable.

References 

Measure theory